Nat Carr (August 12, 1886 – July 6, 1944) was an American character actor of the silent and early talking picture eras. During his eighteen-year career, Carr appeared in over 100 films, most of the features.

Life and career
Carr was born on August 12, 1886, in Poltava in the Russian Empire (now part of Ukraine). In 1887, his family emigrated to the United States. 

Carr entered the film industry in the 1925 film, His People, in the featured role of Chaim Barowitz. Although he may have appeared in an earlier film, 1923's Little Johnny Jones. He appeared in the featured role of Levi in The Jazz Singer in 1927. In 1929 Carr co-wrote the story (with Mark Sandrich) for the film, The Talk of Hollywood, in which he also starred. Other notable films in which he appeared include: as a waiter in Raoul Walsh's 1939 crime drama, The Roaring Twenties, starring James Cagney, Priscilla Lane, and Humphrey Bogart; in the role of Crocker in the 1939 Western, Dodge City, starring Errol Flynn and Olivia de Havilland; as one of the doctors in the Bette Davis tour de force, Dark Victory, which also starred Bogart and George Brent; and as one of the reporters in the 1941 war classic, Sergeant York, starring Gary Cooper. Carr's final screen performance was as a tourist in the 1941 comedy-mystery, Passage from Hong Kong.

Carr died on July 6, 1944, in Hollywood, California. He was buried in Forest Lawn Memorial Park in Glendale, California.

Partial filmography

Little Johnny Jones (1923)
His People (1925)
Her Big Night (1926)
Millionaires (1926)
Private Izzy Murphy (1926)
The Mystery Club (1926)
Watch Your Wife (1926)
Madonna of the Sleeping Cars (1928)
The Talk of Hollywood (1929)
Two Plus Fours (1930)
50 Million Frenchmen (1931)
Union Depot (1932)
Big Time or Bust (1933)
I Can't Escape (1934)
Marrying Widows  (1934)   
Red Blood of Courage (1935)
Bank Alarm (1937)
Everybody's Hobby (1939)
King of the Lumberjacks (1940)

References

External links

1886 births
1944 deaths
Ukrainian emigrants to the United States
20th-century American male actors
American male film actors
American male silent film actors
Burials at Forest Lawn Memorial Park (Glendale)